KMZQ 670 kHz, ("AM 670 KMZQ") is a commercial AM radio station in Las Vegas, Nevada. The station airs a conservative talk radio format and is owned and operated by Kemp Broadcasting & Digital Media.

It was granted by the Federal Communications Commission (FCC) with construction permit to decrease its daytime power to 25,000 watts from the original 30,000.  It uses a directional antenna by day.  Because AM 670 is a clear channel frequency reserved for Class A WSCR Chicago, KMZQ must drastically reduce its nighttime power to 600 watts, using a non-directional antenna. The transmitter is off U.S. Route 95 at Alamo Road in Las Vegas.

History
The station was assigned the call letters KSXX on October 10, 2003. On October 26, 2004, the station changed its call sign to KBTB and on July 29, 2008 to the current KMZQ. It signed on as KMZQ in 2008.

On March 1, 2018, KMZQ changed their format from sports to talk, branded as "The Right Talk".

Local programming and staff
 Kevin Wall, Host of Live & Local – Now! on weekday afternoons and evenings from 3:00 p.m. to 6:00 p.m. on KMZQ.

Previous logo

References

External links
 

News and talk radio stations in the United States
MZQ
Radio stations established in 2003